, better known as , is a Japanese comedian who is represented by the talent agency, Ohta Production. Her husband is Shingo Matsuoka which they were a comedy duo called Aka Plu to Danna (which renamed to Chime in March 2015).

Plu graduated from Ibaraki Prefectural Mitsukaido Second High School.

Filmography

TV series

Drama

Radio series

Internet series

Music videos

Magazines

References

External links
Official profile 
 

Japanese women comedians
1977 births
Living people
People from Ibaraki Prefecture